Fujuriphyes hydra is a species of mud dragon within the family Pycnophyidae. It was described from the Mozanbique Channel after an investigation on 2 pockmarks. The species name hydra comes from the name of the fictional deity Hydra created by H.P. Lovecraft.

References 

Animals described in 2020
Kinorhyncha